The Santa Cruz mouse (Peromyscus sejugis) is a species of rodent in the family Cricetidae. It is endemic to Mexico, where it is found only on two small islands in the southern Gulf of California. Feral cats on Santa Cruz Island are a threat.

Description
The fur on the upper parts of the body is a dull greyish color, with a yellow-brown face, and sometimes a yellowish line along the flanks. The underparts are white, and the tail is distinctly darker on its upper surface than on its lower. It is generally similar in appearance to the North American deermouse, but is larger, with a longer snout and a duller color.

Distribution and habitat
Mice have been collected from the bottoms of ravines on the island, rather than on the hilltops. San Diego Island, with an area of just , is little more than a single rocky mound with some ground vegetation and cacti. Santa Cruz mice are the only native mammals known to live on the islands.

References

Peromyscus
Endemic mammals of Mexico
Endemic fauna of the Baja California Peninsula
Rodents of North America
Fauna of Gulf of California islands
Endangered biota of Mexico
Endangered fauna of North America
Mammals described in 1932
Taxonomy articles created by Polbot